Wu Jingui (born January 10, 1961, in Shanghai) is a Chinese football manager who is currently head coach of Chinese Super League club Shanghai Shenhua.

Playing career
While Wu Jingui played for the Shanghai youth football team, he never graduated to the senior team and only played amateur football with the Zhejiang Province football team for a short period. Instead of football, he would concentrate on achieving a soccer management degree, which saw him study in Beijing and Cologne for several years. This would see him gain an assistant management position at Shanghai Shenhua F.C., where he stayed with them until July 21, 2002.

Management career
Wu Jingui would replace Xu Genbao as the head coach of Shanghai Shenhua F.C. on July 22, 2002 after a disappointing start to the 2002 league season, Wu Jingui would eventually steer Shanghai to finish in a disappointing 12th in the league. With a fresh start to the new season Wu Jingui would guide Shanghai to win their first league title in eight years when they won the 2003 Chinese Jia-A League title. Surprisingly he left Shanghai the following season to join Arie Haan as an assistant for the Chinese national team to help him for the 2004 AFC Asian Cup; however, once Arie Haan left after the tournament, Wu Jingui would return to Shanghai as an assistant again. At the beginning of the 2006 Chinese Super League he would return as the head coach of Shanghai Shenhua when he replaced Valeri Nepomniachi and coach them to second within the league.

At the beginning of the 2007 Chinese Super League season, Shanghai Shenhua F.C. had a new owner in Zhu Jun, and he replaced Wu Jingui with Osvaldo Gimenez. Wu Jingui was, however, quickly brought back in after Osvaldo Gimenez's disappointing reign to help them salvage their season and would steer them to a respectable fourth within the league. Wu Jingui's third reign at Shanghai didn't last very longer as after ill health and a disappointing start to the season he was sacked and replaced with Jia Xiuquan.

On 6 September 2012,  Wu was officially appointed as the technical director and interim head coach of Chinese Super League club Shandong Luneng Taishan F.C., after Dutch manager Henk ten Cate resigned.

Honours

Manager
Shanghai Shenhua
Chinese FA Cup: 2017

References

External links
Biography and related News

1961 births
Living people
Chinese footballers
Footballers from Shanghai
Chinese football managers
Shandong Taishan F.C. managers
Zhejiang Professional F.C. managers
Association footballers not categorized by position
Chinese Super League managers
Shanghai Shenhua F.C. non-playing staff
Qingdao F.C. managers